Fernando González was the defending champion, but lost in the quarterfinals to Björn Phau.

Second-seeded Andy Roddick won in the final 6–4, 6–7(6–8), 6–3, against Dudi Sela.

Seeds
The top four seeds receive a bye into the second round.

Draw

Finals

Top half

Bottom half

External links
Draw
Qualifying draw

China Open
2008 China Open (tennis)